The 2015 Vanderbilt Commodores football team represented Vanderbilt University during the 2015 NCAA Division I FBS football season. The Commodores played their home games at Vanderbilt Stadium at Dudley Field in Nashville, Tennessee, which has been Vanderbilt football's home stadium since 1922. Derek Mason coached the Commodores for his second year. They are members of the Eastern Division of the Southeastern Conference (SEC). The Commodores finished with a losing record for the second year in a row with an overall record of 4–8 and 2–6 in SEC play.

Coaching staff

 Derek Mason - Head Coach/Defensive Coordinator
 Andy Ludwig - Offensive Coordinator/Quarterbacks Coach
 Charles Bankins - Special Teams Coordinator/Running Backs Coach
 Gerry Gdowski - Recruiting Coordinator/Tight Ends Coach
 Cortez Hankton- Wide Receivers Coach
 Keven Lightner - Offensive Line Coach
 Marc Mattioli - Safeties Coach
 Frank Maile - Defensive Line Coach
 Brett Maxie - Cornerbacks Coach
 Kenwick Thompson - Associate Head Coach/Linebackers Coach
 Tosin Abari - Director of Player Development
 Tyler Barnes - Director of Player Personnel
 Tom Bossung - Head Athletic Trainer
 Matt Britain - Assistant Director of Operations
 Cedric Calhoun - Assistant Strength Coach
 Tyler Clarke - Assistant Strength Coach
 Kevin Colon - Associate Director of Student Athletics
 James Dobson - Head Strength Coach
 Jason Grooms - Director of Football Operations
 Matt Ruland - Assistant-Recruiting/Operations
 Ben Schumacher - Assistant Strength Coach
 Chris Singleton - Equipment Manager
 Vavae Tata - Assistant-Player Development
 Ryan Anderson - Graduate Assistant - Defense
 Rod Chance - Quality Control Defense
 A.J. Haase - Graduate Assistant -Offense
 Eric Lammers - Assistant Director, Player Personnel
 Chris Marve - Graduate Assistant - Defense
 Johnell Thomas - Graduate Assistant - Strength
 Gary Veach - Assistant Head Equipment Manager

Post season awards
Zach Cunningham—All-SEC First Team

Schedule
Vanderbilt announced their 2015 football schedule on October 14, 2014. The 2015 schedule consist of 6 home and away games in the regular season. The Commodores will host SEC foes Georgia, Kentucky, Missouri, and Texas A&M, and will travel to Florida, Ole Miss, South Carolina, and Tennessee.

Schedule Source:

Game summaries

WKU

Georgia

Austin Peay

Ole Miss

Middle Tennessee

South Carolina

Missouri

Houston

Florida

Kentucky

Texas A&M

Tennessee

References

Vanderbilt
Vanderbilt Commodores football seasons
Vanderbilt Commodores football